The St. Peter's Church is a parish of the Roman Catholic Church in Halden in Viken county, Norway. It was consecrated on October 10, 1877.

The church was designed by Dutch architect Pierre Cuypers. Due to a translation-related misunderstanding, he had originally designed the church for a population of about 10,000 people, corresponding to the entire population of the Halden at the time. Catholics in the city then amounted to about 20 people. The plans were modified to about 1/3 the size originally projected.

The church has neo-Gothic elements and was built in red brick.

See also
Catholic Church in Norway
Roman Catholic Diocese of Oslo

References

 

Buildings and structures in Halden
Roman Catholic churches completed in 1877
Churches in Viken
19th-century Roman Catholic church buildings in Norway
1877 establishments in Norway